A G-string is a garment consisting of a narrow piece of material that covers the genitals, a string-like piece that passes between the buttocks, and a very thin waistband around the hips. There are designs for  both women and men. Men's G-strings are similar to women's but have a front pouch that covers the genitals. G-strings are typically worn as underwear or swimwear or as part of the costume of an exotic dancer.

G-strings are usually made of fabric, lace, leather, or satin. They may serve as a bikini bottoms or they may be worn alone as monokinis or topless swimsuits. G-strings are also be worn by go-go dancers. As underwear, G-strings may be worn in preference to panties to avoid the creation of a visible panty line, or to briefs in order to enhance sex appeal.

The two terms G-string and thong are sometimes used interchangeably; however, technically they refer to different pieces of clothing. G-strings have a thinner back strip than thongs, and usually a thinner waistband.

Etymology 
The etymology of the term G-string is uncertain, with the Merriam-Webster dictionary describing it as "unknown".

In the 19th century, the term geestring referred to the string which held the loincloth of Native Americans and later referred to the narrow loincloth itself. William Safire in his Ode on a G-String quoted the usage of the word "G-string" for loincloth in New York Times.

Safire also mentions the opinion of linguist Robert Hendrickson that G (or gee) stands for groin, which was a taboo word at the time. Rachel Shteir refers to Hendrickson's opinion in her book "Striptease" and adds that during the Great Depression, a "G-string" was known as "the gadget", a double-entendre that referred to a handyman's "contrivance", an all-purpose word for the thing that might "fix" things.

Cecil Adams, author of the blog The Straight Dope, has proposed an origin from "girdle-string", which is attested as early as 1846.

History 
The G-string first appeared in costumes worn by showgirls in the United States in Earl Carroll's productions during the 1920s, a period known as the Jazz Age or the Roaring Twenties. Before the Depression most performers made their own G-strings or bought them from travelling salesmen, but from the 1930s they were usually purchased from commercial manufacturers of burlesque costumes. During the 1930s, the "Chicago G-string" gained prominence when worn by performers like Margie Hart. The Chicago area was the home of some of the largest manufacturers of G-strings and it also became the center of the burlesque shows in the United States. Early performers of color to wear a G-string on stage included the Latina stripper Chiquita Garcia in 1934, and "Princess Whitewing", a Native American stripper near the end of the decade.

The term G-string started to appear in Variety magazine during the 1930s. In New York City, G-strings were worn by female dancers at risqué Broadway theatre shows during the Jazz Age. During the 1930s and 1940s, the New York striptease shows in which G-strings were worn were described as "strong". In shows referred to as "weak" or "sweet" the stripper wore "net panties" instead. "Strong" shows usually took place only when the police were not present, and they became rarer after 1936 when Fiorello H. La Guardia, the Mayor of New York City, organised a series of police raids on burlesque shows.

The American burlesque entertainer Gypsy Rose Lee is popularly associated with the G-string. Her striptease performances often included the wearing of a G-string; in a memoir written by her son Erik Lee Preminger she is described as gluing on a black lace G-string with spirit gum in preparation for a performance.

By the late 1980s G-strings had become widely available in the Western world, and they became increasingly popular during the 1990s. In 1994 a men's G-string was the best selling design of HOM, a luxury men's underwear brand owned by Triumph International. In Africa the G-string has become a fashionable item of clothing for young women, and they are often visible above the back of low-rise jeans as a whale tail.

In modern strip clubs the strippers often wear G-strings and the customers often give them tips by placing banknotes in their G-strings. The wearing of G-strings in strip clubs is required in some jurisdictions under laws that prohibit public nudity. Some regulations cover the design of G-string allowed. These regulations have in many cases been determined by liquor boards and can differ significantly over a short distance.

Disposable G-strings are sometimes worn for modesty when spray tan is being applied at a beauty salon.

In fiction 
 In the Tarzan novels of Edgar Rice Burroughs, Tarzan is described as wearing a G-string made of doe or leopard skin.

 Gypsy Rose Lee was the purported author of the best-selling 1941 detective novel The G-String Murders in which strippers are found strangled with their own G-strings. The novel was filmed in 1943 as Lady of Burlesque.

References 

20th-century fashion
Lingerie
Swimsuits
Undergarments